Ruvo can refer to:

 Ruvo del Monte, town and commune in the province of Potenza, in the region of Basilicata
 Ruvo di Puglia, town and commune in the Metropolitan City of Bari, Apulia, southern Italy